Holcoceroides is a monotypic genus of carpenter moths (family Cossidae). It includes only the species Holcoceroides ferrugineotincta and is doubtfully distinct from Holcocerus. Like the latter, its relationships to other Cossidae are not determined with certainty. The species is found in Equatorial Guinea, Ivory Coast, Nigeria and Sudan.

References

Politzariellinae
Moths of Africa
Monotypic moth genera
Taxa named by Embrik Strand
Cossidae genera